"Angel" is a promo single from singer/songwriter Kate Voegele's second studio album, "A Fine Mess".  This single, and the rest of her album, is produced by Mike Elizondo, who has worked with the likes of P!nk and Maroon 5.

Charts

References

2009 singles
2009 songs
Interscope Records singles